Fuscoporia is a genus of polypore fungi in the family Hymenochaetaceae. It was circumscribed by American mycologist William Alphonso Murrill in 1907.

Species
Fuscoporia altocedronensis
Fuscoporia bifurcata
Fuscoporia callimorpha
Fuscoporia contigua
Fuscoporia discipes
Fuscoporia ferrea
Fuscoporia ferruginosa
Fuscoporia flavomarginata
Fuscoporia formosana
Fuscoporia longisetulosa
Fuscoporia palomari
Fuscoporia rhabarbarina
Fuscoporia senex
Fuscoporia setifera
Fuscoporia torulosa
Fuscoporia undulata
Fuscoporia wahlbergii
Fuscoporia yunnanensis

References

Hymenochaetaceae
Agaricomycetes genera